Toute la mémoire du monde (English: All the Memory in the World) is a documentary short film by Alain Resnais released in 1956.

Synopsis 
An essay on the potential and limits of dutifully archived human knowledge, masquerading as a documentary on the organisation of the Bibliothèque nationale de France.

Collaborators

Gérard Willemetz
Pierre Goupil
Anne Sarraute
Roger Fleytoux
Claude Joudioux
Jean Cayrol
André Goeffers
Jean-Charles Lauthe
Chris Marker (as Chris and Magic Marker)
Dominique Raoul-Duval
Chester Gould
Denise York
Benigne Caceres
Agnès Varda
Monique Le Porrier
Paulette Borker
André Heinrich
Madame Searle
Lee Falk
Phil Davis
Marie-Claire Pasquier
Robert Rendigal
François-Régis Bastide
Giulietta Caputo
Joseph Rovan
Claudine Merlin

External links 
 
 
 

1956 films
French black-and-white films
Films directed by Alain Resnais
1950s short documentary films
French short documentary films
1956 documentary films
1950s French-language films
1950s French films